StorageMart is a  chain of self-storage facilities headquartered in Columbia, Missouri that operates facilities across the USA, Canada and the UK. StorageMart was founded in 1999 by Gordon Burnam, who had been involved in the self-storage industry since 1974.

Burnam and his four children each hold executive positions within the company. Mike Burnam is the company's president. The company CEO is Cris Burnam, and the CFO is Ryan Mckenzie.

Company overview

Early history
Prior to founding StorageMart, Gordon Burnam founded the storage company Storage Trust, which he took public in 1994 on the New York Stock Exchange under the ticker SEA. The company operated out of its home office in Columbia, Missouri until it was acquired by Public Storage for $600 million in 1999. StorageMart came to public attention in the early 2000s by using non-traditional buildings to house its storage facilities, including the use of a 10-story mid-rise building in Miami, Florida. This allowed the company to open facilities that were easily accessible for urban dwellers, and camouflage these facilities such that they appear to be just another office or residential complex. By the end of 2001 the firm had opened 31 facilities across the US, including both traditional storage units and climate-controlled units capable of housing more perishable or sensitive goods like wine.

North American expansion
The demand for self-storage spaces in the US grew over the early part of the 2000s. By 2005 the company had facilities in eleven states, including Texas, where it purchased five properties in March 2005. By 2006 the firm operated sixty facilities across the US.

In 2007 the company expanded into Canada, and according to Garry Marr of the Financial Post, it "is now one of the dominant players in the country with 70 properties and about 5 million square feet". This includes more than three dozen facilities in metropolitan Toronto. In 2011-12 these facilities installed 640,000 square feet of solar collectors on their roofs, providing 3 megawatts of power. In 2009 TKG-StorageMart Canada took ownership of InStorage Real Estate Investment Trust for about $416 million. This increased the number of storage facilities   to  120, making it "one of the largest privately owned storage companies in North America" according to Cris Burnam. By 2012 StorageMart had more facilities in Canada than any other self-storage company.

As of 2013 the firm  had 132 storage facility locations across the US and Canada. The company also sells moving and packing supplies. By May 2014 it had about 9.8 million square feet of rental space, in a total of  149. faciltieis  The average length of stay in its units is 42 months. StorageMart facilities have been featured on shows including Storage Wars and Storage Wars: Canada. In 2014, it purchased 31 additional facilities. By 2016 the company had 172 locations.

Since then, StorageMart has continued to grow, and as of 2021, operates more than 250 locations across the United States, Canada, and the U.K., making up approximately 15,200,000 square feet of rentable space across over 134,000 units.

Europe
In 2016, StorageMart acquired 15 locations in southeastern England, formerly owned by Big Box Storage Centre

Charitable giving
StorageMart is committed to giving back to the many communities it calls home through its Store it Forward program. StorageMart has provided free rent to charities like Blair’s Tree of Hope and partnered with others like Global Giving in 2017 to raise $50,000 in disaster relief for Hurricane Irma. In 2017 alone, the self-storage company donated more than $159,000 to charities, in addition to donating over $370,000 in free rent to charities throughout the US, Canada, and UK.  In 2018, Storage-Mart began donating $25 per online review they receive to Big Brothers Big Sisters.

References

External links
 StorageMart

Storage companies
Companies based in Columbia, Missouri
1999 establishments in Missouri
Call centre companies
Participants in American reality television series
American companies established in 1999